The Valachi Papers is a 1972 Italian-French crime neo noir directed by Terence Young. It is an adaptation of the 1968 non-fiction book of the same name by Peter Maas, with a screenplay by Stephen Geller. It tells the story of Joseph Valachi, a Mafia informant in the early 1960s who was the first ever mafioso to acknowledge the organization's existence. The film stars Charles Bronson as Valachi and Lino Ventura as crime boss Vito Genovese, with Jill Ireland, Walter Chiari, Joseph Wiseman, Gerald S. O'Loughlin, Guido Leontini, Amedeo Nazzari, Fausto Tozzi, Pupella Maggio, and Angelo Infanti.

Plot 
Joseph Valachi is an aging prisoner in the Atlanta Federal Penitentiary, who was imprisoned for smuggling heroin. The boss of his crime family, Vito Genovese, is imprisoned there as well. Genovese is certain that Valachi is an informant, and gives him the "kiss of death," whereupon Valachi kisses him back.

Valachi mistakenly kills a fellow prisoner who he wrongly thinks is a mob assassin. Told of the mistake by federal agents, Valachi becomes an informant. He tells his life story in flashbacks, from when he was a young criminal to a gangster associating with bosses such as Salvatore Maranzano. Maranzano tells a mourner at a funeral, "I cannot bring back the dead. I can only kill the living." Valachi marries a boss's daughter, played by Bronson's real-life wife Jill Ireland.

Valachi's rise in the Mafia is hampered by his poor relations with his capo, Tony Bender. Bender orders the castration of Valachi's business partner for having relations with another mobster's wife. Valachi shoots the victim to put him out of his misery.

The mayhem and murder continue to the present, with Valachi shown testifying before a Senate committee. He is upset with having to testify and attempts suicide, but in the end (according to information superimposed on the screen) outlives Genovese, who dies in prison.

Cast

Production 
Producer Dino de Laurentiis had to convince Charles Bronson to take the role of Joe Valachi. He reportedly turned it down at least twice before accepting it when he found out the character got to age from his late teens to early 60s. Bronson was also given a three-film contract that guaranteed him $1 million per picture plus a percentage of the gross.

The film was shot in New York City and at De Laurentiis' studios in Rome. Production began on March 20, 1972.

The film shows a 1930s night street scene, 27 minutes into the film, in which numerous 1960s model cars are parked and drive by. In another scene depicted as occurring in the early 1930s, Valachi, eluding police pursuit, drives a car into the East River just north of the Brooklyn Bridge, where the Twin Towers of the World Trade Center are clearly visible against the dawn sky; the Towers were only recently completed when the film was released in 1972.

Paramount, the film's original distributor, had planned to release the film in February 1973, but the premiere date was moved up to capitalize on the popularity of the similarly-themed film The Godfather. Bronson's opinion of Francis Ford Coppola's gangster epic, although he admired Marlon Brando's performance, was "The Godfather? that was the shittiest movie I've ever seen in my entire life." On The Dick Cavett Show however, he called The Godfather a good picture.
The film departed from the true story of Joseph Valachi, as recounted in the Peter Maas book, in a number of ways.  Though using real names and depicting real events, the film also contained numerous events that were fictionalized. Among them was the castration scene (the mobster in question was ordered killed, not castrated).

Reception

Box office
The Valachi Papers grossed about $17 million domestically, generating theatrical rentals of $9.3 million.

Critical response
Reviews were mostly negative, as many critics inevitably compared the film unfavorably to The Godfather. Roger Greenspun of The New York Times wrote, "Often ludicrous and often just dull, Terence Young's 'The Valachi Papers' has the look of a movie project that ran short of ideas before it was finished, and ran out of class almost before it was begun." A positive review in Variety called the film "a hard-hitting, violence-ridden documented melodrama of the underworld" that "carries a fine sweep that immediately projects it as an important crime picture." Roger Ebert of the Chicago Sun-Times gave the film two-and-a-half stars out of four and called it "an ambitious but not inspired movie about the mob." Gene Siskel of the Chicago Tribune awarded two stars out of four and wrote, "Generally, 'The Valachi Papers' tries to cover too many years, and thus provides paper-thin treatment of each event. As a result, the film implies power and violence, but rarely shows it. The visual power of 'The Godfather' has been replaced with meaningless names and dates." Kevin Thomas of the Los Angeles Times dismissed the film as "two hours of relentless tedium, interrupted from time to time by savage violence." Gary Arnold of The Washington Post declared the film "a stiff. It may be possible to make a duller gangster melodrama, but I would hate to sit through the attempt ... It takes considerable ineptitude to produce a gangster movie this enervating." John Raisbeck wrote in The Monthly Film Bulletin, "Inviting inevitable comparisons with The Godfather, Terence Young's film proves markedly, even surprisingly, inferior to Coppola's on every level. Young and his screenwriter Stephen Geller, though faithful in fact to Peter Maas' original document, have simply plodded through a catalogue of events, content to name names but failing to treat the material with any consistency of form or theme."

Other media

In popular culture
 In the October 27, 1973, Season 2, Episode 7 of The Bob Newhart Show, entitled "Old Man Rivers," Bob, his wife, Emily, Bob's receptionist and friend Carol, and her date go to see a film entitled Big Al, which is being promoted with the tagline, "If you liked The Godfather and The Valachi Papers," you'll love Big Al."
 In Season 1, Episode 21 of the 1970s television sitcom Maude, titled "The Perfect Couple", Walter tells Maude that he loves her more today than he did yesterday. Maude's response is, "Oh, darling. Oh, Walter. You're so sweet and poetic. If Shakespeare had known you, he never would have written Romeo and Juliet. He would have written The Valachi Papers!"
 In Season 5, Episode 11 of the HBO series The Sopranos, titled "The Test Dream", Tony Soprano holds a copy of the novel the movie is based upon during a complicated dream sequence. He is standing at a urinal next to a corrupt police officer who questions Tony's resolve in taking action. Tony holds up a copy of the book and replies, "I've done my homework."

References

External links 
 
 

French crime films
Italian crime films
1972 films
Films about the American Mafia
Films set in New York City
Crime films based on actual events
Films based on non-fiction books about organized crime
Films directed by Terence Young
1970s crime films
Films set in the 1930s
Films set in the 1940s
Films set in the 1950s
Films set in the 1960s
Films scored by Riz Ortolani
Films produced by Dino De Laurentiis
Cultural depictions of Lucky Luciano
Cultural depictions of Salvatore Maranzano
Cultural depictions of Vito Genovese
Cultural depictions of Albert Anastasia
Cultural depictions of Joe Masseria
English-language French films
English-language Italian films
1970s Italian films
1970s French films